Givardon is a commune in the Cher department in the Centre-Val de Loire region of France.

Geography

Population

Sights
 The church of St. Pierre.
 The chateau of Alarde, dating from the fifteenth century.

See also
Communes of the Cher department

References

Communes of Cher (department)